Mickey's WaterWorks was the summertime parade at Hong Kong Disneyland from 2007-2013. It was originally created exclusively for Hong Kong Disneyland for the 2007 summer season by Walt Disney Creative Entertainment, and was presented by Bonaqua Drinking Water. Although Mickey's WaterWorks officially began its run on July 14 of that year, it made its debut one week earlier. The only year it didn't run during its run was in 2011, when Hong Kong Disneyland continued on with their Flights of Fantasy Parade. This parade has not run since summer 2013.

History
As the title suggests, Mickey's WaterWorks is a splashy parade created to refresh and bring watery fun to guests from all walks of life. The parade showcases how Mickey Mouse and more than 30 other Disney characters keep Hong Kong Disneyland's landscape looking so beautiful and lush. However, guests viewing the parade must be aware that water is everywhere on the route, except for the Dry Areas of the route located by signs along the route.

Favorite Disney characters, some of whom had never appeared at Hong Kong Disneyland before (such as the Big Bad Wolf and Pinocchio) prior to the debut of this parade, entertain guests with a water-filled extravaganza of music, dance and a host of colorful themed floats together with over 100 performers (including said 30 characters) set to an original score.

References

Walt Disney Parks and Resorts parades
Former Walt Disney Parks and Resorts attractions
2007 establishments in Hong Kong
2013 disestablishments in Hong Kong